Datuk Seri Mah Siew Keong (Hokchew BUC: Má Siù-Khhíong; born 17 June 1961) is a Malaysian politician who served as Minister of Plantation Industries and Commodities and Minister in the Prime Minister's Department in the Barisan Nasional (BN) administration under former Prime Minister Najib Razak from June 2014 to the collapse of the BN administration in May 2018, Member of Parliament (MP) for Teluk Intan from November 1999 to March 2008 and again from May 2014 to May 2018 and Member of the Perak State Legislative Assembly (MLA) for Pasir Bedamar from April 1995 to November 1999. He is a member of the Parti Gerakan Rakyat Malaysia (GERAKAN), a component party of presently the Perikatan Nasional (PN) and formerly BN coalition. He also served as the 5th President of GERAKAN from October 2013 to September 2018.

Early life and education 
Mah Siew Keong was born in Teluk Intan, Perak on the 17 June 1961.

Mah studied at Horley Methodist primary and secondary school in Teluk Intan and later continued his studies in the United Kingdom. He graduated with Bachelors in Science (Management) from the London School of Economics and Political Science (LSE) in 1981. He then obtained his master's degree in Business Administration (MBA) from the City University of London. In 1991, Mah graduated with an LLB from the University of East London.

Mah is also a member of MENSA.

Political career

Party 
Mah joined Parti Gerakan Rakyat Malaysia in 1993. He was attracted by the party's struggle for a just, fair and egalitarian Malaysia. Mah steadily rose up the party ranks and held many positions at all the division, state and national levels.

In 2003, Mah was elected as the National Youth Chairman of Gerakan and the Chairman of Teluk Intan Gerakan Division. He was also appointed by the then Party President, the late Tun Dr Lim Keng Yaik as a member of the Party's highest decision making body, the Central Working Committee. Mah also served as the Secretary of the Gerakan Perak State Liaison Committee from 2005 to 2008.

In the 2008 Party election, Mah was elected as one of the party's three elected vice-presidents' with the highest votes. In the aftermath of the 2013 General Election, Mah was also appointed as the Secretary-General of Gerakan after the resignation of Teng Chang Yeow.

In the 2013 Party Election, Mah was elected as the Party President of Gerakan by defeating Teng Chang Yeow, the Chairman of Gerakan Penang State Liaison Committee.

Mah stepped down on 16 September 2018 and was succeeded by Dominic Lau Hoe Chai as Party President of Gerakan

Government 
Mah has served in various capacities in the Federal Government of Malaysia. After the 2004 General Election, Mah was appointed as Deputy Minister of Trade and Industry. In February 2006, after a Cabinet reshuffle, Mah was appointed as Deputy Minister of Agriculture and Agro-based Industries.

Between September 2010 and September 2013, Mah was the Chairman of the Malaysian External Trade Development Corporation (MATRADE).

After Mah's victory in the Teluk Intan By Election 2014, he was appointed as Minister in the Prime Minister's Department.

In July 2016, Mah was appointed as Minister of Plantation Industries and Commodities in cabinet reshuffle by the Prime Minister.

Electoral history 
Mah was elected as the state assemblyman (ADUN) of Pasir Bedamar in the Perak State Legislative Assembly in 1995. Pasir Bedamar is one of the two state seats that form the Teluk Intan Parliamentary Constituency, the other being Changkat Jong.

In 1999, Mah contested Teluk Intan Parliamentary Constituency and defeated Raj Nallaiya of the Democratic Action Party (DAP). In 2004, Mah was reelected as the Member of Parliament of Teluk Intan by defeating Wu Him Ven of the DAP and N. Gobalakrishnan of the People's Justice Party (PKR).

In the 2008 General Election, Mah was defeated by M. Manogaran of the DAP and it was Mah's first electoral loss since his debut in 1995. The loss corresponded with BN's loss of its customary two-thirds majority in parliament. However, Mah continued to operate a service centre and assisted the voters of his hometown to the best of his ability.

In the 2013 General Election, Mah was once again defeated; by Seah Leong Peng of the DAP with 7,313 votes majority.

However, in early 2014 Seah died of cancer, necessitating the 2014 Teluk Intan by-election. Mah accepted the nomination of the party and BN to contest as its candidate for the by-election while DAP nominated Dyana Sofya Mohd Daud as its candidate. After an intense 14 day campaign, Mah prevailed narrowly by 238 votes majority. Mah was dubbed the comeback kid of BN.

Mah lost and failed to retained his seat in the 2018 General Election.

Election Results

Honours
  :
  Grand Commander of the Order of the Territorial Crown (SMW) - Datuk Seri (2016)
  :
  Knight Commander of the Order of the Perak State Crown (DPMP) - Dato' (2004)
  Knight Grand Commander of the Order of the Perak State Crown (SPMP) - Dato' Seri (2016)

See also
Telok Intan (federal constituency)

References 

 

1949 births
Living people
People from Perak
Malaysian politicians of Chinese descent
Parti Gerakan Rakyat Malaysia politicians
Government ministers of Malaysia
Members of the Dewan Rakyat
Members of the Perak State Legislative Assembly
21st-century Malaysian politicians